The Bigamist is a 1956 Italian comedy film directed by Luciano Emmer.

Plot 
Mario De Santis, an enterprising trade representative who sells toothpastes, regularly married to Valeria, sees his life upset by the accusation of being bigamous. Accompanied to the police station, he is confronted with a certain Isolina Fornaciari, whom he would have married in Forlimpopoli a few years earlier. Mario, furious at the accusation, goes into de facto ways with Isolina's father, with whom he has a fight so much that he is put under arrest. Moreover, no one seems to believe in his innocence, not even his wife, who lets herself be negatively influenced by her sister and the family lawyer.

When Mario is granted bail, his case is entrusted to an eccentric prince of the forum, talkative and extravagant. A friend of Mario's, met in prison, realizes that it could be a case of the same name and sets out to travel all over Rome in search of Isolina's real husband. When he finds him, he manages to drag him to court where, in the meantime, Mario - following the advice of his defender - has pleaded guilty. Thus the court, while recognizing him innocent of the charge of bigamy, condemns him for self-malignancy; and Isolina, who, complicated by her condition as an elderly single girl, had exploited the circumstance to try to frame a handsome man, is in turn condemned for perjury. Having served the small sentence inflicted on him, Mario can finally return to the arms of his family, who are waiting for him at the exit of the prison.

Cast
 Marcello Mastroianni - Mario De Santis
 Franca Valeri - Isolina Fornaciari
 Giovanna Ralli - Valeria Masetti
 Marisa Merlini - Enza Masetti
 Vittorio De Sica - L'onorevole Principe / Attorney Principe
 Memmo Carotenuto - Quirino Proietti
 Ave Ninchi - La signora Masetti / Missis Masetti
 Vincenzo Talarico - L'avvocato di parte civile
 Guglielmo Inglese - Don Vincenzino
 Mario Passante
 Fernando Milani
 Ruggero Marchi
 Salvo Randone
 Anita Durante - Amalia

References

External links

1956 films
1950s Italian-language films
1956 comedy films
Italian black-and-white films
Films directed by Luciano Emmer
Films set in Rome
Films with screenplays by Age & Scarpelli
Italian comedy films
Films scored by Alessandro Cicognini
1950s Italian films